Hi Ho! Cherry-O is a children's put and take board game currently published by Hasbro in which two to four players spin a spinner in an attempt to collect cherries. The original edition, designed by Hermann Wernhard and first published in 1960 by Whitman Publishers,  had players compete to collect 10 cherries. In 1987, there was a video cassette version, made by Golden Book Video in the hi-ho video line, this involved a character, farmer Bing, asking for your help to collect cherries. During an update in 2007, the rules were updated to include a cooperative play variant, where players cooperate to remove all fruit from the board before a bird puzzle is completed. In 2015, Winning Moves Games USA published a classic edition.

Gameplay
Each player starts the game with an empty basket and 10 cherries on their tree. Players take turns spinning the spinner and performing the indicated action. The spinner is divided into seven sections:
Take one cherry off of the tree.
Take two cherries off of the tree.
Take three cherries off of the tree.
Take four cherries off of the tree.
Dog: Replace cherries on the tree: two if the player has at least that many, or one if they have only one. If the player's bucket is empty, this space has no effect.
Bird: Same effect as the dog.
Spilled basket: Return all cherries to the tree. If the player's bucket is empty, this space has no effect.

The first player to collect all the cherries from their tree and call "Hi Ho! Cherry-O" wins the game.

Analysis
The game length can be determined using a Markov chain, yielding the following results:
Minimum game length: 3 
Average game length: 15.8 
Maximum game length: Unbounded 
25th percentile: 7 moves
50th percentile (median): 12 moves
75th percentile: 21 moves
95th percentile: 40 moves

References

External links
 Hasbro's Hi Ho! Cherry-O product page
 Hi Ho! Cherry-O at BoardGameGeek Includes many pictures of various game editions.

Board games introduced in 1960
Milton Bradley Company games
Children's board games